Jeff Collins may refer to:
 Jeff Collins (North Carolina politician) (born 1955), member of the North Carolina General Assembly
 Jeff Collins (Australian politician) (born 1961), member of the Northern Territory Legislative Assembly
 Jeffrey H. Collins (1930–2015), known as Jeff, British electrical engineer
 Jeff Collins (producer), founder of Collins Avenue Productions
 Jeff Collins (New York politician), candidate for New York State Senate